Alexander Marshal (c.1620 – 7 December 1682 in London) was an English entomologist, gardener and botanical artist, noted for four albums of paintings, including the florilegium he compiled, consisting of some 160 folios of plants cultivated in English gardens, and finally presented to George IV in the 1820s.

Marshal belonged to a coterie of gentleman gardeners from London, who cultivated and studied rare plants. These previously unknown species were introduced to England from the Near East and the New World in the 1600s. Marshal worked on his florilegium for some thirty years, and despite his not being a professional artist, his book boasts some of the most pleasing images in botanical art  - it is now part of The Royal Collection, at the Royal Library at Windsor Castle. The plates depict more than 600 plant species, and detailed studies of insects, birds and mammals. It is notable as being the only known surviving florilegium by an English artist from the 1600s.

Samuel Hartlib, the German polymath, wrote that Marshal had by 1650 produced a florilegium for the botanist and gardener John Tradescant the Younger. It was catalogued as "A Book of Mr Tradescant's choicest Flowers and Plants, exquisitely limned in vellum, by Mr. Alex. Another album, of thirty-three paintings on vellum, is in the British Museum.

Though long known as a botanical illustrator, his talent in depicting insects only came to light in 1980. His album of 63 folios has 129 watercolours of a variety of insects – butterflies, moths, caterpillars, beetles, locusts, spiders, flies, and crickets –  some by other artists. it is now in the Academy of Natural Sciences of Drexel University, in Philadelphia. On the reverse side of his drawings are notes in his own hand, providing much autobiographical material. Marshal described his Lepidopterid subjects in meticulous detail. He enlisted the aid of Tradescant, and of his friend Henry Compton, Bishop of London, in acquiring many rare, exotic insects. 

Marshal was described as an accomplished painter of flowers and fruit in Sir William Sanderson's Graphice of 1658. His experimenting with pigments led to their being extracted from flowers, berries, gums, and roots, as well as verdigris and arsenic. He painted for the pleasure it gave to him and his horticulturist friends. William Freind, Marshal's great nephew and heir, wrote of him as having "an independent fortune and painting merely for his amusement". He believed that plants could only be understood if they were grown to reveal their complete life-cycle. 

Earlier in his life he operated as a merchant, living for some time in France. He is recorded living at Ham in 1650, London in 1651, and Islington in 1654, staying there with the son of an Alderman Dewes. His final years were spent at Fulham Palace, the home of Bishop Compton, from 1675 until his death there on 7 December 1682. He left behind a childless widow, Dorothea (whom he married on 26 July 1678), the daughter of Francis Smith. He was buried at All Saints Church, Fulham, in front of the altar, where an inscription on his tombstone reads, in part: 

A selection of Marshal's works was shown at the "Amazing Rare Things: The Art of Natural History in the Age of Discovery" exhibition at The Queen's Gallery, Buckingham Palace, curated by David Attenborough.

Bibliography

References

Botanical illustrators
1620 births
1682 deaths